John Anthony Lowey (7 March 1958 – 5 August 2019) was an English footballer who played as a midfielder. Aside from three seasons in the North American Soccer League, one in the American Soccer League and one in Australia, Lowey spent the majority of his career in the Football League Second Division with Blackburn Rovers in England.

Career
Lowey joined the Chicago Sting of the North American Soccer League in 1976 and claimed five goals and seven assists from 17 games. He returned to the Chicago Sting for part of the 1977 season, but only made five appearances. He spent July to August 1977 with Port Vale, spent September as a non-contract player at Blackburn Rovers, and then returned to Port Vale the next month. He returned to the US in 1978 and signed with the California Sunshine in the American Soccer League, before going on to score 10 goals in 21 games for the Sunshine. He returned to England to make his debut for Sheffield Wednesday on 17 October 1978. He went on to score five goals from 36 league and FA Cup matches in the 1978–79 season. However he was limited to just 13 appearances in the 1979–80 season as manager Jack Charlton led the club to promotion out of the Third Division, and left Hillsborough after making his final appearance for the "Owls" in the League Cup on 26 August 1980. He signed with Blackburn Rovers in November 1980, who were now managed by Howard Kendall. At first he was a back-up striker, with Norman Bell preferred in the starting eleven. He went on to find success as a midfielder, and was an ever-present during the 1983–84 campaign. He was dropped for Colin Randell in the 1984–85 season, before returning to favour during the second half of the 1985–86 campaign. He went on to play for Wigan Athletic, Chesterfield (on loan), York City (on loan), Preston North End, Chester City, and Brisbane Lions.

Later life
After retiring as a player, Lowey lived the rest of his life in Australia and went on to own a Beauty Therapy training school and a licensed securities company.

Career statistics
Source:

Honours
Sheffield Wednesday
Football League Third Division third-place promotion: 1979–80

References

1958 births
2019 deaths
Footballers from Manchester
English footballers
English expatriate footballers
Association football midfielders
Association football forwards
Manchester United F.C. players
Port Vale F.C. players
Blackburn Rovers F.C. players
Chicago Sting (NASL) players
California Sunshine players
Sheffield Wednesday F.C. players
Wigan Athletic F.C. players
Chesterfield F.C. players
York City F.C. players
Preston North End F.C. players
Chester City F.C. players
North American Soccer League (1968–1984) players
American Soccer League (1933–1983) players
English Football League players
National Soccer League (Australia) players
Expatriate soccer players in the United States
Expatriate soccer players in Australia
English expatriate sportspeople in the United States